Dosuru is a suburban area  of  Visakhapatnam state of Andhra Pradesh, India.

About

References

Neighbourhoods in Visakhapatnam